Ryan Laplace (born 25 July 1998) is a French footballer who currently plays as a forward for Chambly.

Club career
Having been released by Monaco in 2016, Laplace joined Lega Pro side Mantova. He moved to Serie D side Rieti in 2017.

Career statistics

Club

Notes

References

External links
 

1998 births
Living people
French footballers
French expatriate footballers
Association football forwards
AS Monaco FC players
Mantova 1911 players
S.S.D. Correggese Calcio 1948 players
FC Chambly Oise players
Serie C players
Serie D players
French expatriate sportspeople in Italy
Expatriate footballers in Italy